Westwood High School is a public high school located in Palestine, Texas (United States) and classified as a 3A school by the UIL. It is part of the Westwood Independent School District located in west central Anderson County.  The school is located on US Hwy 79 just west of the city of Palestine. In 2015, the school was rated "Met Standard" by the Texas Education Agency.

Athletics

The Westwood Panthers compete in these sports – 

Baseball
Basketball
Cross Country
Football
Golf
Powerlifting
Softball
Tennis
Track and Field
Volleyball

References

External links
Westwood ISD

Schools in Anderson County, Texas
Public high schools in Texas